The WalkerZ is a Latino web series on YouTube. It premiered on April 28, 2014, and was created by and stars Trebor Santini in one of the lead role as Jason Méndez.

Plot
Two brothers are trying to survive a sudden virus outbreak that has turn almost all of Puerto Rico population into infected, now they had left everything behind joining some other survivors they start to realize the infected are not the only ones they need to fear as they struggle for survival in the island. the series is a drama spoof with several references from popular zombie TV shows or films, but the plot is based in the island of Puerto Rico.

Cast

Main Survivors

Recurring Survivors & Foes 
 Trini Menendez & Dori Perez as Roxana F. Rodriguez (2 episodes)
 Josue Mendez as Javier F.  Rodriguez (3 episodes)
 Wilfred Omar as "Nair" (3 episodes)
 Hector Vega as Fercho (8 episodes)
 Kidany Marrero as Andres (5 episodes)
 Neyda Rodriguez as Michelle (3 episodes)
 Roxana Huarte as Amelia (5 episodes)
 Myriam Barroso as Jezika (2 episodes)

Episode list

Production 
It is an apocalyptic zombie comedy drama series a mixture between some popular TV shows and films like Zombieland, The Walking Dead, Resident Evil franchise and Warm Bodies. Filming production of the web series first season The WalkerZ: Prologue in December 2013 with the script been written for the two first seasons. The series name was slightly changed from "Z-WalkerZ" to "The WalkerZ" on November 20, 2013. Cast participate at local Zombie Run 5k to promote the series with a giveaway on October 13, 2013. The show's first season ended filming in August 2014.

In January 2015 the second season of The WalkerZ started production with a trailer released on the 28th the title was revealed as The WalkerZ: Infected. The theme song was updated with a new format and new song by the band Virgen Bionica. New main characters where introduced and episode length was extended from 7 mins to 15 min per episode.

It was announced on the official Facebook page on May 30, 2015 that the web series was renewed for a third season titled The WalkerZ: Viral consisting on 10 brand new episodes to start airing in April 2016.

On August 1, 2015 a special Q/A episode featuring the cast is coming out by the end of the month before the premiere of the remaining 5 episodes from season two, this episode will feature around 50 questions made by fans through Facebook, Twitter and Instagram. As of November 11, 2015, filming for Season 2 has wrapped, with two remaining episodes set to air during November and December 2015.

Production for Season 3 is expected to start on May 15, 2016, all main and regular cast will be back to reprise there role, although Jean Pagan as Daryck Mendez will be reduced to a recurring role during the new season. It was announced new episodes will now be featured also on Facebook Video along with YouTube Streaming,

Future Seasons

On April 29, 2016 it was mentioned on the official website that ideas for a 4th Season are being  taken in consideration, Although the only cast member returning will be Trebor Santini as Jason Mendez. The rumored title for the season is The WalkerZ: Surviving.

On August 23, 2016 it was announced that the 3rd season would be split into two seasons of 5 episodes instead of the usual 10 episode count, this is due production timing and actors schedule. While Season 3 titled Viral is expected to air during late Fall-Winter 2016, the 4th Season titled Decay would air during spring 2017. Production was put on hold due to hurricane affecting Puerto Rico severely.

On September 6, 2018 almost a year after the hiatus, it was announced that the 3rd season would be re-written since hurricane affected filming locations and several actors left the island, due to this it would be a 5 episode arc ending the series to continue on as short films based on volumes, with Volume one being a soft reboot containing two new actors alongside Trebor Santini as Jason, with on going plots and story's from the series the film would focus more on surviving and scavenging, this is set to be released during Fall 2019, but episodes for the 3rd and final season would be released during fall 2018

On January 2. 2020 the project went once again in production since 2018 to resume on filming and finish the 3rd Season, the script was once again edited to modify some character and plot changes, The season was extended to 7 episodes instead of 5 and Filming began on February 23, 2020 for the first 2 episodes. The series is expected to return sometime in April–May 2020.

Due to Covid-19 filming was paused, during March–September 2020 with only 3 episodes filmed for season 3. The series went into production once again during October–December to wrap up the remaining episodes. The premiere date was also put on hold with no further date released. While filming the remaining episodes of the final season, The short film was also shot back-to-back with production ending on December 10, 2020.

On April 18, 2021 the release date for the first trailer of the final season was announced on Facebook for April 20. 2021. While the series premiere date is set to October 2021.

References

External links
 
 
 
 IMDB
 indiegogo.com
 Facebook
 Twitter
 Google
 n-punto.com

2014 web series debuts
American comedy web series
Zombie web series